General elections were held in Denmark on 22 September 1964. The Social Democratic Party remained the largest in the Folketing, with 76 of the 179 seats. Voter turnout was 86% in Denmark proper, 50% in the Faroe Islands and 49% in Greenland. They were the first elections with the new electoral threshold of 2%.

Results

References

Elections in Denmark
Danish general election
General election
Danish general election